Donka may refer to the following:

Donka (name)
Donka Hospital, Guinean hospital

See also

Cecimonster Vs. Donka, Peruvian rock band
Danka (disambiguation)